The GB Pro-Series Shrewsbury is a tournament for professional female tennis players played on indoor hardcourts. The event is classified as a $60,000 ITF Women's Circuit tournament. It is held in Shrewsbury, England, since 2008. From 2008 to 2012, it was a $75,000 level tournament, before downgrading to a $25,000 level tournament until 2019. In 2019, the prize money increased from $25,000 to $60,000.

Past finals

Singles

Doubles

External links
 

ITF Women's World Tennis Tour
Hard court tennis tournaments
Tennis tournaments in England
Recurring sporting events established in 2008